Antanaitis is a Lithuanian surname.  Notable people with the name include the following:

Jonas Algirdas Antanaitis (1921 – 2018), Lithuanian politician
Sean Antanaitis, multi-instrumentalist for the American band Celebration (2000s band)

See also

Lithuanian-language surnames
Patronymic surnames